Antonio Campos may refer to:

 António Campos (1922–1999), Portuguese visual ethnographer
 Antonio Campos (athlete) (born 1951), Spanish Olympic athlete
 Antonio Campos (director) (born 1983), American film producer and director
 Tony Campos (Antonio Campos, born 1973), American heavy metal bassist and vocalist